Carabus dufourii is a species of black-coloured beetle from family Carabidae that are endemic to Spain. It is "one of the most representative species of the Carabus [genus] to the south of the Iberian Peninsula".

Subspecies
The species contain only 2 subspecies which could be found on Gibraltar and in Spain:
Carabus dufourii baguenai Breuning, 1926 Spain
Carabus dufourii dufourii Dejean, 1829 Gibraltar & Spain

References

Carabus
Beetles described in 1829
Endemic fauna of Spain
Beetles of Europe